The 1976 United States presidential election in Georgia was held on November 2, 1976. The Democratic candidate, former Governor of Georgia Jimmy Carter, overwhelmingly won his home state with 66.74% of the vote ahead of the Republican Party candidate, incumbent President Gerald Ford, giving him the state’s 12 electoral votes. Carter carried all of Georgia’s 159 counties (the last time any presidential candidate has won every single county in the state) and 10 congressional districts by wide margins.

This is the only presidential election in Georgia's history where the Democratic candidate carried all of Georgia’s counties, despite the state's long Democratic streak, as Republicans never carried the state until 1964, compared to this beginning of just a 2-election streak. This represented a complete flip from the previous election when President Richard Nixon also carried every county in Georgia. Carter’s percentage total in the popular vote, however, was less than that of previous Democratic victors in the state like Woodrow Wilson, James M. Cox, John W. Davis, and Franklin D. Roosevelt. Nevertheless, none of these candidates carried every county in the state, as Carter remains the solitary Democrat to carry historically pro-Union, East Tennessee-oriented Fannin County since 1912, and indeed the only Democrat to obtain a majority of the vote there since William Jennings Bryan in 1900. The following counties have also never voted for a Democrat since: Dade, Walker, Catoosa, Fayette, Columbia, Lee and Lowndes. The two suburban Atlanta counties of Cobb and Gwinnett would not vote for a Democrat again until Hillary Clinton won them in 2016. Georgia was Carter’s strongest state in the 1976 election.

Results

Results by county

Notes

References

1976
Georgia
1976 Georgia (U.S. state) elections